Pelophylax terentievi, commonly known as Terentjev's frog or Central Asian pond frog, is a species of frog in the family Ranidae. It is found in Xinjiang, China and Tajikistan, and possibly in Afghanistan.

Its natural habitats are swamps and hot deserts. Its status is insufficiently known.

References

terentievi
Amphibians of China
Fauna of Tajikistan
Amphibians described in 1992
Taxonomy articles created by Polbot